Pigg may refer to:

People
Alexandra Pigg (born 1962), British actress who first came to prominence as Petra Taylor in the TV soap opera Brookside
Billy Pigg (1902–1968), English player of Northumbrian smallpipes
Charles Pigg (1856–1929), English cricketer, golfer and tutor
Herbert Pigg (1856–1913), English cricketer
Landon Pigg (born 1983), singer-songwriter and actor from Nashville, Tennessee

Other uses
Pigg River, in Virginia, United States

See also

Pig (disambiguation)